Achebe is a Nigerian surname of Igbo origin. Notable people with the surname include:

 Alfred Achebe (born 1941), 21st Obi of Onitsha
 Chinedu Achebe (born 1977), former American football player
 Chinua Achebe (1930–2013), Nigerian novelist, poet and critic
 Nancy Achebe, Nigerian librarian and information scientist
 Nwando Achebe, academic, feminist scholar, and historian

See also 
Achebe (character), a fictional character in Marvel comics

Igbo-language surnames